Richard L. Gage (born Washington) is an American historian. He specializes in Japanese history and the history of warfare.

Bibliography 
 Peace Is Our Duty: Accounts of What War Can Do To Man 
 Women Against War: Personal Accounts of Forty Japanese Women 
 Choose Hope: Your Role in Waging Peace in the Nuclear Age 
 Letters of Four Seasons

References 

Year of birth missing (living people)
Living people
21st-century American historians
American male non-fiction writers
21st-century American male writers